The following is a list of Supreme Court of Canada opinions written by Sheilah Martin during her tenure on the Court.

2018
{| width=100%
|-
|
{| width=100% align=center cellpadding=0 cellspacing=0
|-
! bgcolor=#CCCCCC | Sheilah Martin 2018 statistics
|-
|

Supreme Court of Canada reasons by judge